Chrosiothes is a genus of comb-footed spiders that was first described by Eugène Louis Simon in 1894. It is considered a senior synonym of Theridiotis.

They have thick legs and two minute setae in place of a colulus. Males are noticeably smaller than females.

They are closely related to members of Episinus, Spintharus, Thwaitesia and Anelosimus.

Species
 it contains twenty-seven species that occurs almost exclusively in the New World from the United States to Brazil, with one species found in China, Korea and Japan, and two species endemic to Taiwan:
Chrosiothes carajaensis Puchulú-Figueiredo, Santanna & Rodrigues, 2017 – Brazil
Chrosiothes chirica (Levi, 1954) – USA, Mexico
Chrosiothes cicuta Puchulú-Figueiredo, Santanna & Rodrigues, 2017 – Brazil
Chrosiothes decorus Puchulú-Figueiredo, Santanna & Rodrigues, 2017 – Brazil
Chrosiothes diabolicus Puchulú-Figueiredo, Santanna & Rodrigues, 2017 – Brazil
Chrosiothes episinoides (Levi, 1963) – Chile
Chrosiothes fulvus Yoshida, Tso & Severinghaus, 2000 – Taiwan
Chrosiothes goodnightorum (Levi, 1954) – Mexico to Costa Rica
Chrosiothes iviei Levi, 1964 – USA
Chrosiothes jamaicensis Levi, 1964 – Jamaica, Dominican Rep.
Chrosiothes jenningsi Piel, 1995 – USA
Chrosiothes jocosus (Gertsch & Davis, 1936) – USA, Mexico
Chrosiothes litus Levi, 1964 – Mexico
Chrosiothes minusculus (Gertsch, 1936) – USA, Mexico
Chrosiothes murici Puchulú-Figueiredo, Santanna & Rodrigues, 2017 – Brazil
Chrosiothes niteroi Levi, 1964 – Bolivia, Brazil, Argentina
Chrosiothes perfidus Marques & Buckup, 1997 – Brazil
Chrosiothes portalensis Levi, 1964 – USA, Mexico
Chrosiothes proximus (O. Pickard-Cambridge, 1899) – Mexico to Panama
Chrosiothes silvaticus Simon, 1894 (type) – USA to Ecuador
Chrosiothes sudabides (Bösenberg & Strand, 1906) – China, Korea, Japan
Chrosiothes taiwan Yoshida, Tso & Severinghaus, 2000 – Taiwan
Chrosiothes tonala (Levi, 1954) – Mexico to Honduras
Chrosiothes una Puchulú-Figueiredo, Santanna & Rodrigues, 2017 – Brazil
Chrosiothes valmonti (Simon, 1898) – St. Vincent
Chrosiothes venturosus Marques & Buckup, 1997 – Brazil
Chrosiothes wagneri (Levi, 1954) – Mexico

Formerly included:
C. australis (Simon, 1896) (Transferred to Episinus)

See also
 List of Theridiidae species

References

Further reading

Araneomorphae genera
Spiders of Asia
Spiders of North America
Spiders of South America
Theridiidae